Envoi is a single-movement orchestral composition by the American composer Christopher Rouse.  The work was commissioned by the Atlanta Symphony Orchestra with additional contributions from Thurmond Smithgall.  It was first performed May 9, 1996 in Atlanta Symphony Hall, Atlanta by the Atlanta Symphony Orchestra under conductor Yoel Levi.  The piece is dedicated to Rouse's mother, who died in the summer of 1993.

Composition
Envoi has a duration of approximately 20 minutes and is composed in a single adagio movement.  Rouse described his inspiration for the work in the score program notes, writing:
He continued:

Rouse likened the work spiritually to his 1992 Violoncello Concerto as a meditation on death, but remarked, "I also believe that this work will set the seal, for a time at least, on my scores which have been composed as a response to death — I hope so, at any rate."

Instrumentation
The work is scored for an orchestra comprising two flutes, two oboes, two clarinets (2nd doubling bass clarinet), four French horns, three trumpets, four trombones, tuba, timpani, three percussionists, harp, and strings.

Reception
Dan Tucker of the Chicago Tribune praised Envoi as "an impressive piece" and wrote:
Joshua Kosman of the San Francisco Chronicle described it as "a slow elegy to the composer's mother that concludes with a delicate stretch of transfiguration".  Janos Gereben of the San Francisco Classical Voice wrote, "Rouse first portrays the stopping of the heart in his own way (not as an imitation of the Mahler Ninth) and then follows up with a superb extended passage that grabs the listener and stays with him long after the concert".  He added, "Instead of transcendence, Envoi presents a resigned, accepting lament, a gentle meandering night music."

References

Compositions by Christopher Rouse
1995 compositions
Compositions for symphony orchestra
Music commissioned by the Atlanta Symphony Orchestra